Pontiac Lake is an all-sports, 640-acre Oakland County, Michigan lake along the Huron River. The lake lies primarily in White Lake Township, while a small portion of the lake lies in Waterford Township.

It is the fifth largest lake in the county.

Pontiac Lake is a public lake with a public boat launch.

The Pontiac Lake Recreation Area is located at the lake.

History

Pontiac Lake is a man-made lake created in 1926 when Lime Lake, a small lake in the upper Huron River watershed, was dammed. It lies about seven miles west of Pontiac, Michigan.

Since 1999, Pontiac Lake has hosted "Quake on the Lake", an annual hydroplane boat race.

Fish

Pontiac Lake fish include Carp, Catfish, Crappie, Largemouth Bass, Northern Pike, Smallmouth Bass, Sunfish, Bowfin, Walleye and Yellow Perch.

References

Lakes of Oakland County, Michigan
Reservoirs in Michigan
Lakes of Waterford Township, Michigan
Huron River (Michigan)